The Roman Catholic Diocese of Birmingham may refer to:

 Roman Catholic Diocese of Birmingham in Alabama
 Roman Catholic Archdiocese of Birmingham in England